The men's 81 kg competition at the 2019 World Weightlifting Championships was held on 21 and 22 September 2019.

Schedule

Medalists

Records
Prior to this competition, the existing world records were as follows.

Results

New records

References

Results 

Men's 81 kg